Virupaksha Temple is located in Hampi in the Vijayanagara district of Karnataka, India. It is part of the Group of Monuments at Hampi, designated as a UNESCO World Heritage Site. The temple is dedicated to Sri Virupaksha, a form of Shiva. The temple was built by Lakkan Dandesha, a nayaka (chieftain) under the ruler Deva Raya II also known as Prauda Deva Raya of the Vijayanagara Empire.

Hampi, capital of the Vijayanagara empire, sits on the banks of the Tungabhadra River (Pampa hole/Pampa river). Virupaksha Temple is the main center of pilgrimage (ತೀರ್ಥಯಾತ್ರೆ )at Hampi, and had been considered the most sacred sanctuary over the centuries. It is intact among the surrounding ruins and is still used in worship . The temple is dedicated to Lord Shiva, known here as Virupaksha/Pampa pathi, as the consort of the local goddess Pampadevi who is associated with the Tungabhadra River. There is also a Virupakshini Amma temple (mother goddess) in a village called Nalagamapalle, Chittoor district, Andhra Pradesh, approximately 100 km from Tirupati.

History
The temple's history is uninterrupted from about the 7th century. The Virupaksha-Pampa sanctuary existed well before the Vijayanagara capital was located here. Inscriptions referring to Shiva date back to the 9th and 10th centuries. What started as a small shrine grew into a large complex under the Vijayanagara rulers. Evidence indicates there were additions made to the temple in the late Chalukyan and Hoysala periods, though most of the temple buildings are attributed to the Vijayanagara period. The huge temple building was built by Lakkana Dandesha, a chieftain under the ruler Deva Raya II of the Vijayanagara Empire.

Ceiling Paintings in the Virupaksha date to fourteenth and sixteenth century.  The religious sect of Virupaksha-Pampa did not end with the destruction of the city in 1565. Worship there has persisted throughout the years. At the beginning of the 19th century there were major renovations and additions, which included restoring some of the broken towers of the north and east gopura.

This temple is the only well preserved and maintained temple in Hampi until date; the other numerous temples in Hampi were destroyed and ruined by the Bahmani sultanates.

Temple structure
At present, the main temple consists of a sanctum, three ante chambers, a pillared hall and an open pillared hall. It is decorated with delicately carved pillars. A pillared cloister, entrance gateways, courtyards, smaller shrines and other structures surround the temple.

The nine-tiered eastern gateway, which is the largest at 50 meters, is well-proportioned and incorporates some earlier structures. It has a brick superstructure and a stone base. It gives access to the outer court containing many sub-shrines.

The smaller eastern gateway leads to the inner court with its numerous smaller shrines.

Another gopuram towards north known as the Kanakagiri gopura, leads to a small enclosure with subsidiary shrines and eventually to the river Tungabhadra.

A narrow channel of the Tungabhadra River flows along the temple's terrace and then descends to the temple-kitchen and out through the outer court.

One of the most striking features of this temple is the usage of mathematical concepts to build and decorate it. The temple has repeated patterns that demonstrate the concept of Fractals. The main shape of the temple is triangular. As you look up the temple top, the patterns divide and repeat themselves, just like you would see in a snowflake or some other natural wonders.

Krishnadevaraya, one of the famous kings of the Vijayanagara Empire was a major patron of this temple. The most ornate of all structures in the temple, the central pillared hall is believed to be his addition to this temple. So is the gateway tower giving access to the inner courtyard of the temple. Inscriptions on a stone plaque installed next to the pillared hall explain his contribution to the temple. It is recorded that Krishna Devaraya commissioned this hall in 1510 AD to mark his accession. He also built the eastern gopuram. These additions meant that the central shrine came to occupy a relatively small part of the complex. The halls in the temple were used for a variety of purposes. Some were spaces in which the images of gods were placed to witness special programmes of music, dance, drama, etc. Others were used to celebrate the marriages of deities.

Festivals
The temple continues to prosper and attracts huge crowds for the betrothal and marriage festivities of Virupaksha and Pampa in December.

In the month of February the annual chariot festival is celebrated here every year.

References

External links

 Virupaksha Temple Photographs, 2013
 Virupaksha Temple complete information

Shiva temples in Karnataka
Hampi
7th-century Hindu temples
Hindu temples in Vijayanagara district